František Hadviger (born 13 July 1976) is a retired Slovak football midfielder.

References

1976 births
Living people
Slovak footballers
FC Spartak Trnava players
FC Fastav Zlín players
FK Dubnica players
1. FC Tatran Prešov players
FC Volgar Astrakhan players
MŠK Rimavská Sobota players
FC DAC 1904 Dunajská Streda players
Czech First League players
Association football midfielders
Slovakia international footballers
Slovak expatriate footballers
Expatriate footballers in the Czech Republic
Slovak expatriate sportspeople in the Czech Republic
Expatriate footballers in Russia
Slovak expatriate sportspeople in Russia